San Bernardo is a village in the municipality of China, Nuevo León, Mexico.

References

Populated places in Nuevo León